Andrew William Spruce (born April 17, 1954 in London, Ontario) is a retired professional ice hockey player who played 172 games in the National Hockey League with the Colorado Rockies and Vancouver Canucks. Spruce played major junior with the London Knights of the Ontario Hockey Association, and was selected by the Canucks in the 1974 NHL amateur draft. He turned professional that year, spending two seasons in the minor Central Hockey League. He joined the Canucks in 1976, splitting the season between the NHL and CHL, before moving to Colorado where he played for two seasons. Spruce spent one more season in the CHL, and two in the American Hockey League, before retiring in 1982.

Career statistics

Regular season and playoffs

External links

1954 births
Living people
Canadian ice hockey left wingers
Colorado Rockies (NHL) players
Erie Blades players
Fort Worth Texans players
Ice hockey people from Ontario
London Knights players
Phoenix Roadrunners draft picks
Seattle Totems (CHL) players
Springfield Indians players
Sportspeople from London, Ontario
Tulsa Oilers (1964–1984) players
Vancouver Canucks draft picks
Vancouver Canucks players